Trumble is a surname of English, Scottish and Irish origin. Notable people with this surname include:

Angus Trumble (1964–2022), Australian scholar, art curator and author
Billy Trumble (1863–1944), Australian cricketer
David Trumble (born 1986), British film writer/director
Francis Trumble (?–1791), American chair and cabinetmaker
Hal Trumble, (1926–2010), American ice hockey administrator and referee
Hugh Trumble (1867–1938), Australian cricketer
Robert Trumble (1919–2011), Australian musician and author
Thomas Trumble (1872–1954), Australian public servant
Hugh Compson Trumble (1894-1962), Australian surgeon

English-language surnames